is a Japanese weightlifter. She equalled the Japanese weightlifting record for her class. She is an alumna of the Waseda University Weightlifting Club. She competed in the women's 63 kg event at her first Olympics in 2016 in Rio.

References

External links
 

1992 births
Living people
Japanese female weightlifters
Olympic weightlifters of Japan
Weightlifters at the 2016 Summer Olympics
Place of birth missing (living people)
Weightlifters at the 2014 Asian Games
Asian Games competitors for Japan
21st-century Japanese women